SkyscraperCity, also known as SkyscraperCity.com, is the world's largest online forum on skyscrapers and urban related topics. The website, which currently runs on XenForo, was founded in 2002 by Dutch economist Jan Klerks running on vBulletin, in order to share and solicit comment on urban development in Rotterdam. It gradually expanded to include other city and country subforums, eventually encompassing the entire world.

As of 2019, the forum has over 1 million members, 1 million threads and over 110 million posts. By some measures, it was considered the largest online forum in the world in 2010 or largest online bulletin board in the world. In 2009, the forum attracted more than 500,000 unique visitors daily. In 2018, SkyscraperCity was acquired by VerticalScope and the forum was migrated from vBulletin to XenForo in 2020.

Volunteers
The site works by allowing members to add photos and other details to the website. Despite the fact that many facts on the site are not vetted, news organizations quote the users on the web site. The photos uploaded by volunteers are often used in news articles.

See also
Emporis
SkyscraperPage
Structurae
Council on Tall Buildings and Urban Habitat

References

External links
Skyscraper City

Internet forums
Skyscrapers